{{Infobox wrestling team
|article_name = House of Black
|type = S
|image = AEW HOB logo.jpg
|caption =  
|members = Malakai Black (leader)Brody KingBuddy MatthewsJulia Hart
|names = The House of Black 
Kings of the Black Throne (Black/King)
|billed = 
|heights = 
|weights = 
|debut = August 1, 2021
|disbanded = 
|years_active = 2021–present
}}
The House of Black is a professional wrestling stable, currently performing in All Elite Wrestling (AEW). The stable consists of Brody King, Buddy Matthews, and Julia Hart, and led by Malakai Black. Black, King and Matthews are the current AEW World Trios Champions in their first reign, while Black and King also wrestle for Pro Wrestling Guerrilla (PWG), where they are the reigning World Tag Team Champions in their first reign.

The group started in PWG at Mystery Vortex 7 in 2021, where Black and King formed a tag team The Kings of the Black Throne. They would win the promotion's World Tag Team Championship later that year. King joined AEW in 2022, where Black was already competing, thus beginning Kings of the Black Throne's run in AEW.

History
Pro Wrestling Guerrilla (2021–present)
Malakai Black made his surprise debut for Pro Wrestling Guerrilla (PWG) at Mystery Vortex 7, the promotion's first event since 2019, on August 1, 2021 by aiding Brody King in rescuing the PWG World Champion Bandido from an assault by Super Dragon, Black Taurus and Demonic Flamita. Black announced that he would be back the following month and King said that he would follow Black where he would go, thus forming a tag team called Kings of the Black Throne. At Threemendous VI, Kings of the Black Throne defeated Taurus and Flamita to win the vacant World Tag Team Championship.

All Elite Wrestling (2022–present)
Malakai Black made his All Elite Wrestling debut on the 7 July 2021 episode of Dynamite, attacking Arn Anderson and Cody Rhodes with the Black Mass. In early 2022, Black began a feud with The Varsity Blonds (Brian Pillman Jr. and Griff Garrison) and Death Triangle (Pac and Penta El Zero Miedo). On the January 12, 2022 episode of Dynamite, Brody King made his AEW debut, thus continuing their team "Kings of the Black Throne" and subsequently forming the stable the House of Black. On the 23 February 2022 edition of Dynamite, Buddy Matthews made his debut as the third man for the "House of Black". The trio would defeat Death Triangle and Erick Redbeard at the Revolution buy-in show.

On April 8, 2022, Black spat black mist in the eyes of Julia Hart, causing her to later resort to wearing an eye patch, and showing signs of opposition to The Varsity Blondes. At Double Or Nothing, The House of Black faced Death Triangle. During the match, Hart sprayed PAC with black mist and officially joined the stable.

At AEW x NJPW: Forbidden Door on June 26, Black was involved in a Four-way match in which he sprayed Miro with black mist, beginning a feud. Brody King had also begun feuding with Darby Allin, with King losing a Coffin match against Allin on 10 August. This culminated in a Six-man tag team match at All Out on September 4 where Darby Allin, Sting, and Miro defeated House of Black.

At AEW Revolution, The House of Black would successfully go on to win the AEW World Trios Championship from The Elite.

Championships and accomplishments
 All Elite Wrestling AEW World Trios Championship (1 time, current)
 Pro Wrestling Guerrilla'''
 PWG World Tag Team Championship (1 time, current) – Malakai Black and Brody King

References

All Elite Wrestling teams and stables
Fictional cults
Independent promotions teams and stables